Rahmatou Keïta is a Nigerien journalist, writer, and film director, whose film career began in 1990. She won the prestigious 7 d'or for L'assiette anglaise,(2005), the Sojourner Truth Award for Al’lèèssi…, her first feature film.

Life and career

Born in Niger, Rahmatou Keïta is a daughter of the Sahel and one of the descendant Sundiata Keïta. As she puts it, she is of the true essence of the Sahelian countries : She is Fulani, Songhai and Mandingo.

After studying philosophy and linguistics in Paris, she started her career in France.
Before becoming a movie director, she made herself a name as a journalist for European TV channels. With the team of the TV Magazine L'assiette anglaise, on [France 2].

She directs short films and created the TV series Femmes d’Afrique (Women from Africa) (26 x 26 minutes episodes – 1993-1997), screened on national channels in Africa.
With friends, Rahmatou Keïta started Sonrhay Empire Productions, to produce films “off” beaten tracks.
In 2005, her first feature film Al'lèèssi..., about pioneers of African cinema such as Zalika Souley, was selected at Cannes Film Festival and won the Sojourner Truth Award. Al’lèèssi… received several awards such as the Best Documentary Award at Montreal, FIFAI and won the Sojourner Truth Award at Cannes.

A committed militant of the African cause, Keïta is a founding member of the Panafrican Association for Culture (ASPAC) and takes an active part in the dialogue of cultures and civilisations. 
Zin’naariyâ! (The Wedding Ring) is her latest film.

Her daughter Magaajyia Silberfeld is an actress and director.

Filmography

Feature films

Television

References

Living people
Nigerien film directors
Nigerien journalists
Nigerien women journalists
Year of birth missing (living people)
Nigerien women writers